The Rogers Sportaire is an American homebuilt aircraft that was designed David M. Rogers and produced by Rogers Aircraft of Riverside, California, introduced in 1959. The aircraft was supplied in the form of plans for amateur construction, but plans are no longer available. Only one was built.

Design and development
The aircraft features a cantilever low-wing, a two-seats-in-side-by-side configuration enclosed cockpit under a bubble canopy, fixed tricycle landing gear and a single engine in tractor configuration.

The aircraft fuselage is made from welded steel tubing, with the  span wing made from wood, all covered in doped aircraft fabric. The engine used in the sole example is  a  Lycoming O-290 powerplant.

Operational history
By October 2013 only one example had been registered in the United States with the Federal Aviation Administration.

Specifications (Sportaire)

References

External links
Photo of the Sportaire airframe under restoration
Photo of the Sportaire instrument panel under restoration
Photo of the Sportaire dataplate

Sportaire
1950s United States sport aircraft
Single-engined tractor aircraft
Low-wing aircraft
Homebuilt aircraft